is a district located in Fukuoka Prefecture, Japan, east of Fukuoka City.

As of 2003, the district has an estimated population of 200,503 and a density of 1,218.05 persons per km2. The total area is 164.61 km2. It has four stations on the Sasaguri Line, seven on the Kashii Line. Chojabaru Station serves both lines.

Towns and villages
Hisayama
Kasuya
Sasaguri
Shime
Shingū
Sue
Umi

Towns and Villages formerly in this district
Koga（古賀町）:Upgraded to City（古賀市） on October 1, 1997

Districts in Fukuoka Prefecture